Abdulhadi Muhammad Al-Khayat (Arabic: عبدالهادي محمد الخياط; born March 6, 1979) is a Kuwaiti bodybuilding champion, police officer, and commando.

Biography 
Kuwait National Team athlete, and a member of International Federation of BodyBuilding & Fitness, Al-Khayat is a super-heavyweight bodybuilder. His weight is approx. 231.5−264.5 pounds (105−120 kilograms). Al-Khayat started his international career in 2012; during the Saudi Arabia and Qatar Bodybuilding Championships he was awarded gold in heavy/super-heavyweight category. His next prestigious competition, IFBB Asian Amateur Bodybuilding Championships, took place in 2013. During the contest Al-Khayat placed first in super-heavyweight category, and fourth in classic bodybuilding category. He has saved this title the next year. Also in 2014, he competed in his first American contest — Arnold Classic America. He placed fifth in super-heavyweight category. He was a super-heavyweight and the overall winner of 2015 IFBB World Bodybuilding Championships. The same year Al-Khayat was also the super-heavyweight/overall winner of Olympia Amateur, which was held in Liverpool. In November 2015 he was honored with IFBB Pro Card, and became a professional bodybuilder — the first one from Kuwait.

Living in Kuwait City, he graduated in Communication Systems and works as a police officer. He won the silver medal in 2012 Police Bodybuilding Championships in Qatar. He has a son named Muhammad.

In late 2015 he was cast as Yousef Rambu in Kuwaiti action movie Second Blood, inspired by First Blood and Rambo: First Blood Part II. The film had its world premiere in November 2016.

In 2016 he became a member of the Kuwaiti special operations forces — a commando. He was given the rank of officer.

Measurements 
 Height: 5' 10" (178 cm)
 Competition weight: 231.5 lbs (105 kg)
 Off-season weight: 264.5 lbs (120 kg)
 Biceps: more than 50 cm

Notes

References

External links 
 Abdulhadi Al-Khayat's Facebook fan page

1979 births
Kuwaiti bodybuilders
Kuwaiti military personnel
Living people
People from Kuwait City
Police officers
Professional bodybuilders